Narraghmore is a village in County Kildare, Ireland. It lies within a civil parish of the same name. Nearby villages include Ballytore, Calverstown, and Kilmead.

Narraghmore village is 6.4km from Ballytore and has the M9 motorway and R448 road to the west and the R418 road to the east. The Narraghmore Stud Farm is nearby.

References

External links
 Roman Catholic Parishes of Narraghmore & Moone 

Towns and villages in County Kildare
Articles on towns and villages in Ireland possibly missing Irish place names